Vrata Tunnel is one of the shortest tunnels on the Croatian A6 motorway route. It is located between Oštrovica and Vrata interchanges. The tunnel is tolled within the A6 motorway closed toll collection system. There are no other toll plazas related to use of the tunnel. The tunnel was excavated by Viadukt using New Austrian Tunneling method. The tunnel is noteworthy since it comprises a  bridge spanning a cavern found during excavation.

Tunnel bridge
A  bridge was built over the cavern, accounting for nearly one-quarter of the length of the tunnel. The surrounding rock was stabilized using geotechnical anchors to ensure safety before the bridge construction started. The deck of the bridge consists of reinforced concrete grillage supported by a pair of abutments and longitudinal reinforced concrete girders. Since there is an intermittent watercourse through the cavern, the tunnel tube was sealed to protect the cavern and water flowing through it. This was achieved by construction of a concrete structure covering the bridge deck, hiding the cavern from the motorway users and giving them impression of driving through an unbroken tunnel tube.

Traffic volume 
Traffic is regularly counted and reported by Autocesta Rijeka–Zagreb, operator of the A6 motorway and the tunnel, and published by Hrvatske ceste. Substantial variations between annual (AADT) and summer (ASDT) traffic volumes are attributed to the fact that the motorway carries substantial tourist traffic to Istria and Kvarner Gulf resorts. The traffic count is performed using analysis of toll ticket sales.

See also 
 A6 motorway
 List of longest tunnels

References 

Road tunnels in Croatia
Buildings and structures in Primorje-Gorski Kotar County
Transport in Primorje-Gorski Kotar County